Sultan Abdullah is a village in Iraq  south-southeast of Mosul. It is part of Mosul District in Nineveh Governorate.

References

Populated places in Nineveh Governorate
Populated places on the Tigris River